Mickaël Garciau (born 13 September 1976) is a retired French football defender.

References

1976 births
Living people
French footballers
FC Nantes players
Olympique Alès players
SC Draguignan players
Association football defenders
Ligue 1 players